The 2TE70 is a Russian main line dual unit freight diesel locomotive, rated at . The 2ТE70 Freight diesel locomotive with two six-axle sections shares main parts with the TEP70 and TEP70BS passenger diesel locomotives.

The 2TE70 also shares a number of components with the TEP70BS and TEP70U passenger locomotives.

See also
 The Museum of the Moscow Railway, at Paveletsky Rail Terminal, Moscow
 Rizhsky Rail Terminal, Home of the Moscow Railway Museum
 Varshavsky Rail Terminal, Home of the Central Museum of Railway Transport, Russian Federation
 History of rail transport in Russia

References

Co-Co+Co-Co locomotives
Diesel-electric locomotives of Russia
Luhanskteplovoz locomotives
Railway locomotives introduced in 1988
5 ft gauge locomotives